The 1961 LSU Tigers football team represented Louisiana State University during the 1961 NCAA University Division football season. It was head coach Paul Dietzel's seventh and final season with the team. Following the Tigers' Orange Bowl victory vs. Colorado, Dietzel departed to take the head coaching position at Army.

Schedule

References

LSU
LSU Tigers football seasons
Orange Bowl champion seasons
LSU Tigers football